The Senegal national beach soccer team represents Senegal in international beach soccer competitions and is controlled by the Senegalese Football Federation, the governing body for football in Senegal. It is the most successful African beach soccer team, having won six times the Africa Beach Soccer Cup of Nations, more than any other national team.

Results and fixtures

The following is a list of match results in the last 12 months, as well as any future matches that have been scheduled.

Legend

2021

Team

Current squad
The following players were called up for the 2021 FIFA Beach Soccer World Cup.

Head coach: Oumar Sylla
Assistant coach: Mamadou Diallo
Goalkeeping coach: Cheikh Tidiane Deme

Competitive record

FIFA Beach Soccer World Cup

CAF Beach Soccer Championship
The Senegalese is the most titled Beach Soccer team in Africa. The Lions of Teranga won nine medals in nine participations.

References

External links
Senegal at FIFA
Senegal at BSWW
 Senegal at Beach Soccer Russia

Beach soccer
African national beach soccer teams